Orthotylus marginalis is a species of stinkbugs from Miridae family that can be found throughout Europe (except for Liechtenstein and various European islands). then east across the Palearctic to Central Asia and Siberia.

Description
Their upper surface is covered with dense pale hairs, with brownish antennas.

Ecology
The species members feed on alder, apple trees, currant, sloe, sallow, and willows. Adults feed on Aphididae, Tetranychidae, and Psyllidae. In some cases, they also feed on plants of pear trees, causing the pears to have stoney pits, among other damages.
They are not obligate zoophages.

References

Insects described in 1883
Hemiptera of Europe
marginalis